The McDonnell Douglas MD-12 was a large wide-body airliner concept planned by the McDonnell Douglas company in the 1990s. It was first conceived as a trijet larger than the MD-11, then stretched to a quadjet airliner.  It was to be similar in size to the Boeing 747, but with greater passenger capacity through two full-length passenger decks. However, the MD-12 received no orders and was canceled. McDonnell Douglas then studied larger MD-11 derivatives named MD-XX without proceeding.

Design and development

Background
McDonnell Douglas studied improved, stretched versions of the MD-11 trijet, named MD-12X with a possible lower-front passenger deck with panoramic windows. The MDC board of directors agreed in October 1991 to offer the MD-12X design to airlines. In November 1991, McDonnell Douglas and Taiwan Aerospace Corporation signed a Memorandum of Understanding to form a company to produce the new design. The new company would have McDonnell Douglas as the majority shareholder (51%) with Taiwan Aerospace (40%) and other Asian companies (9%) having the remaining shares.

MD-12

In late 1991, McDonnell Douglas made a move to separate its civil and military divisions in a bid to raise the estimated $4 billion development costs needed to develop the MD-12X trijet. Separating the costly military C-17 airlifter development, which had been a drain on the company's resources, from the profit-making production of the MD-80 and MD-11 airliners would make it easier to attract foreign investors for the MD-12X.

The design grew into the much larger MD-12 with four engines and two passenger decks extending the length of the fuselage.

McDonnell Douglas unveiled its MD-12 design in April 1992. The design was similar in concept to the Airbus A3XX and Boeing New Large Airplane, and it would have been larger than the Boeing 747 with which it would have directly competed.  Douglas Aircraft had also studied a smaller double decker design in the 1960s.

The first flight of the MD-12 was to take place in late 1995, with delivery in 1997.  Despite aggressive marketing and initial excitement, especially in the aviation press, no orders were placed for the aircraft. MDC lacked the resources after Taiwan Aerospace left the project. Some skeptics believed that MDC launched the project to lure Boeing into paying a higher price for the company. A new double deck widebody has proved to be extremely expensive and complex to develop, even for the remaining aerospace giants Boeing and Airbus, although the massive Airbus A380, a similar concept to the MD-12, was later brought to fruition, but was not a financial success.

MD-XX
With the MD-12 program over, McDonnell Douglas focused on 300 to 400–seat MD-11 derivatives. At the 1996 Farnborough International Air Show, the company presented plans for a new trijet with high-seating and long-range named "MD-XX". The MD-XX was offered in two variants; MD-XX Stretch with a longer fuselage and MD-XX LR for longer range. Both MD-XX variant designs had  wingspan, the same as MD-12. The MD-XX Stretch was lengthened  over the MD-11 and had seating for 375 in a typical 3-class arrangement and 515 in all-economy seating. Its range was to be . However, the MDC board of directors decided to end the MD-XX program in October 1996, stating the financial investment for the program was too large for the company.

Variants
The MD-12 was offered in a few proposed variants as listed below.

MD-12 HC (High Capacity)
MD-12 LR (Long Range)
MD-12 ST (Stretch)
MD-12 Twin (two-engine version)

Specifications (MD-12 High Capacity design)

See also

References
Notes

External links

 Undeveloped MD-11/MD-12 models page on MD-Eleven.net
 "McDonnell May Build A Larger Jet", The New York Times, March 16, 1992

Abandoned civil aircraft projects of the United States
Quadjets
MD-012
Low-wing aircraft
McDonnell Douglas MD-11